Lawrence Hayward (born 12 August 1961) is an English singer, songwriter and guitarist. He is known as the frontman in the English indie pop bands Felt, Denim, and Mozart Estate (formerly Go-Kart Mozart). He has never used his surname in credits or press for his work.

Music career

Felt

Felt released ten albums in the 1980s, and Lawrence was the only constant member of the band from its inception in 1979 to its dissolution in 1989, though he doesn't appear at all on the band's penultimate album, Train Above The City, despite being present at the recording sessions. During his time in the band, he served as lyricist and co-songwriter, together with then-lead guitarist Maurice Deebank, who left the band in 1985.

Denim

After the dissolution of Felt, Lawrence formed Denim. Influenced lyrically by Lawrence's upbringing during the 1970s and stylistically by bubblegum and glam rock, Denim released two albums in the 1990s, plus a compilation of B-sides and extra tracks, but mainstream success continued to elude Lawrence. A third album (sometimes referred to as Denim Take Over) was shelved indefinitely, and a standalone single "Summer Smash" was withdrawn from being released shortly after the death of Princess Diana. Lawrence co-wrote the first single by Shampoo, "Blisters and Bruises", released in 1993.

Go-Kart Mozart and Mozart Estate

1999 saw the full-length debut of Lawrence's current project, Go-Kart Mozart, released through his personal imprint, West Midlands Records and distributed by Cherry Red. The 2005 follow-up was titled Tearing Up The Album Chart – a wry comment on his failure to achieve commercial success, a habit the album itself did nothing to break. UNCUT awarded Lawrence the dubious honour of being "one of the stars fame forgot."

In 2006, Lawrence began working on a new Go-Kart Mozart album entitled On the Hot Dog Streets that was eventually released in June 2012 to coincide with the nationwide premiere of Lawrence of Belgravia, which documented the making of the record. Though once again a commercial failure, the album has received the most acclaim and attention of any Lawrence related project since Back in Denim.

Documentary
Filmmaker Paul Kelly directed a documentary about Lawrence, titled Lawrence of Belgravia (a reference both to the Welshman who led the Arab Revolt and the district of Central London in which Lawrence resided), which was set to premiere at the London Film Festival in 2006, but wasn't ready at the time. A 20-minute work-in-progress version of the documentary was screened at the Barbican Centre in London in November 2008. A final finished cut of the film had its debut screening at the 2011 London Film festival, followed by screenings in several film and music festivals. A DVD release of the film with a limited run of 2,000 copies surfaced in June 2016.

Personal life
Due to his reclusive public persona, Lawrence has given very little information away about his personal life, aside from the fact that he was born at 12 Melville Road in Edgbaston, Birmingham, as referred to in the Felt song "Mobile Shack", though moved as a child to the nearby village of Water Orton, Warwickshire, where he met founding Felt members Maurice Deebank and Nick Gilbert. Early on he was heavily influenced by Tom Verlaine of Television in both his guitar-playing and his idiosyncratic vocals. 
He now lives in a tower block close to the Old Street Roundabout in Hackney, London.

In 2018, Lawrence was awarded Maverick of the Year at the Q Awards.

Discography

with Felt

Crumbling the Antiseptic Beauty (1982)
The Splendour of Fear (1984)
The Strange Idols Pattern and Other Short Stories (1984)
Ignite the Seven Cannons (1985)
Let the Snakes Crinkle Their Heads to Death (1986)
Forever Breathes the Lonely Word (1986)
Poem of the River (1987)
Gold Mine Trash (1987)
The Pictorial Jackson Review (1988)
Train Above the City (1988)
Me and a Monkey on the Moon (1989)
Bubblegum Perfume (1990)
Absolute Classic Masterpieces (1992)
Absolute Classic Masterpieces Volume II (1993)
Stains on a Decade (2003)

with Denim
 Back in Denim (1992)
 Denim on Ice (1996)
 Novelty Rock (1997)

with Go-Kart Mozart
 Instant Wigwam and Igloo Mixture (1999)
 Tearing Up the Album Chart (2005)
 On the Hot Dog Streets (2012)
 Mozart's Mini-Mart (2018)

with Mozart Estate
 Pop-Up! Ker-Ching! and the Possibilities of Modern Shopping (2023)

References

External links
 Perfect Sound Forever interview (2003)

1961 births
Living people
English male singers
English songwriters
English rock guitarists
Musicians from Birmingham, West Midlands
Outsider musicians
English male guitarists
British male songwriters